This is a list of wives and consorts of the sovereign rulers of the Isle of Man. Most of these women used other titles that their husband held rather than Queen or Lady of Mann.

List of consorts 
† Husband's death

# Husband's accession or appointment

See also

List of Norwegian consorts
List of Irish consorts
List of Scottish consorts
List of English consorts
List of British consorts
History of the Isle of Man

Notes

Sources
LORDS of the ISLES

Mann
Consorts
Consorts
Consorts
Medieval English people
Lists of royal consorts